François Sébastien Charles Joseph de Croix, Count of Clerfayt (14 October 1733 – 21 July 1798), a Walloon, joined the army of the Habsburg monarchy and soon fought in the Seven Years' War. Later in his military career, he led Austrian troops in the war against Ottoman Turkey. During the French Revolutionary Wars he saw extensive fighting and rose to the rank of Field Marshal.

Early career
Born at the Castle of Bruille in Hainaut in the Austrian Netherlands, he entered the Austrian army in 1753. In the Seven Years' War (1756–1763) he distinguished himself, earning rapid promotion, and received the Military Order of Maria Theresa decoration. At the conclusion of the peace (Treaty of Hubertusburg, 15 February 1763), though still under thirty, he had already become an Oberst (colonel).

During the revolt in the Netherlands in 1787, Clerfayt, as a Walloon by birth, came under great pressure to abandon Emperor Joseph II. But he resisted all overtures, and in the following year went to fight in the Austro-Turkish War with the rank of Feldmarschal-Leutnant (lieutenant field marshal). In an independent command Clerfayt achieved great success, defeating the Turks at Mehadia and Calafat. On 10 November 1788, the emperor appointed him to the rank of Feldzeugmeister.

French Revolutionary Wars
In 1792, as one of the most distinguished of the emperor's generals, he received the command of the Austrian contingent in army of the duke of Brunswick, and at La Croix-aux-Bois his corps inflicted a reverse on the troops of the French Revolution. In the Netherlands, he commanded the center at the Battle of Jemappes on 6 November. He opened the campaign of 1793 with the victory of Aldenhoven and the relief of Maastricht, and on 18 March 1793 proved instrumental in causing the complete defeat of Charles Dumouriez at the Battle of Neerwinden. In October, however, his victorious career suffered a reverse at the Battle of Wattignies.

He participated in the Flanders Campaign against Charles Pichegru in 1794. Leading a flanking column from the north, he fought at the Battle of Tourcoing on 17–18 May. A French force under Dominique Vandamme slowed his progress until Joseph Souham defeated the Anglo-Austrian army on the southern part of the battlefield. Souham then turned against Clerfayt and compelled him to retreat to the northeast. In the course of the campaign. Clerfayt succeeded Prince Josias of Coburg in the supreme command, but he failed to make headway against the French, and had to recross the Rhine.

A Feldmarschall from 22 April 1795, he commanded on the middle Rhine against Jean-Baptiste Jourdan, and this time the fortunes of war changed. Clerfayt beat Jourdan at Höchst and brilliantly relieved Mainz. But the Austrian Foreign Minister Johann Thugut did not approve Clerfayt's action in concluding an armistice with the French, so the field marshal resigned his command and became a member of the Aulic Council in Vienna. He died in 1798.

Clerfaytgasse in Hernals, Vienna is named after him.

Commentary
A brave and skillful soldier, Clerfayt perhaps achieved more than any other Austrian commander (except the Archduke Charles of Austria) in the hopeless struggle of small dynastic armies against a French "nation in arms".

Notes

References

Attribution
 cites as a source:

Further reading
 (in German)

1733 births
1798 deaths
Counts of Austria
Field marshals of Austria
Military leaders of the French Revolutionary Wars
Austrian Empire military leaders of the French Revolutionary Wars
Walloon people
Grand Crosses of the Military Order of Maria Theresa